Nieuw-Beerta is a village with a population of 120 in the municipality of Oldambt in the east of the province of Groningen in the northeast of the Netherlands.

The Royal Netherlands Meteorological Institute has a weather station in the village.

History 
The village was first mentioned in 1660 as Beerter hamrick, and meant "the village dorp belonging to Beerta". In 1822, it was first mentioned as Nieuw-Beerta (New Beerta) to distinguish between Beerta. Nieuw-Beerta is a road village which developed on the dike after the Uiterdijken were poldered in 1657.

The first church was built in 1665, and rebuilt in 1689. The current church dates from 1856. Several villas and farms were built in Jugendstil.

Nieuw Beerta was supposed to be home to 753 people in 1840, however it probably included a much larger area. The village used to have rich farmers, however there is a decline in the late-19th century and the contrast between the rich farmers and the poor farm workers resulted in a five-month long strike in 1929, and the region would become a Communist stronghold. 

Nieuw Beerta used to be part of the municipality of Beerta until 1990. Since 2010, it is part of the municipality of Oldambt.

Gallery

Climate

References

External links 
 

Oldambt (municipality)
Populated places in Groningen (province)